Xeana Kamalani Dung (born March 4, 1997), also known as "Kama Dung", is an American, right-handed softball pitcher, model, actress, and philanthropist from Waianae, Hawaii. She is a gold medalist and is known as the first professional softball pitcher from Hawaii. Dung is currently a professional softball player who pitches on the Puerto Rican national softball team and in the Athletes Unlimited Softball league. She has competed in a number of international tournaments and has gained a large following as an international and collegiate athlete. Dung was the former starting pitcher for the Fresno State Bulldogs and California Golden Bears.

Personal life and early education 
Born and raised in Waianae, Hawaii. Her parents are Honey Rodrigues and Lance Dung. Her younger brother is Lancen Dung. She is of Hawaiian, Puerto Rican, and Chinese descent.

Dung attended Kamehameha Schools.

Dung started playing competitive softball in Hawaii around the age of 10. She is a self-taught pitcher who learned to throw pitches unconventionally from YouTube. Called the 'YouTube' pitcher after coaches learning that she had no prior professional pitching lessons.

High school 
Dung was a four-year varsity starter and captain at Kamehameha Kapalama High School. A four-year varsity athlete at Kamehameha-Kapalama High School in Honolulu, Hawai’i. Dung logged an ERA of 0.82 with 86 strikeouts, seven shutouts and an 11–1 record during her senior campaign. Dung led the team as ace pitcher and captain and acquired three Division I conference championships. Dung led the state in strikeouts and ERA, and paced the league in batting average and doubles. Additionally, she competed for the travel ball teams Mizuno/OC Batbusters and Mililani Prep- Hawai’i.

Dung signed to the Fresno State.

Fresno State 
Dung majored in business administration.

Freshman 

Dung made a debut as a D1 collegiate athlete in the NCAA on October 22, 2015, in an exhibition game against the professional team USSSA Pride at the Margie Wright Diamond.

In the 2016 season Dung went on to become one of the two starting pitchers as a freshman and helped her team to a Mountain West conference Championship, while being a part of one of the most dominant teams in MW history. That year Fresno State was ranked 17 in RPI and had a nation-leading 23-game win streak that set a new school record. Dung was undefeated in conference play and recorded her first regional appearance and save.

Sophomore 
In 2017, Dung earned the All-Region Third Team. The prestigious Mountain West Pitcher of the Year award. All-MW 1st Team. MW Pitcher of the Week in back-to-back weeks (May 2 & May 9). Dung currently holds the All-Time Mountain West Conference record for most Batters Struck Out by a sophomore in a single season with 99. She also ranks top 5 in All-Time MW Games Pitched in a single-season with 13, and Games started in a single-season with 17.

After throwing back-to-back shutouts against Indiana and Purdue during the first two games of the 2017 season, Dung was named ace of the Bulldog's squad since day one as a sophomore and helped Fresno State to their then No. 21 ranking. She later went on to pace national stats and lead the Mountain West in every major pitching category. Dung went 25–13 with a 2.17 ERA, allowed opposing hitters a .216 average, with 202 strikeouts in 238.1 innings and pitched 8 shutouts that season.

Dung earned a spot on the 2017 Puerto Vallarta College Challenge All-Tournament Team after going 2–2 with a 2.90 ERA and 16 strikeouts in 19.1 innings, throwing the only no-hitter of the tournament and the first no-hitter of her career. She appeared in 44 games, including 38 starts. She threw 31 complete games, including a MW-best nine shutouts, and went 26–15 with 218 strikeouts in 254.1 innings.

University of California, Berkeley 
Dung transferred in 2017 to UC Berkeley. Dung majored in sociology.

Junior 
As a junior, Dung made her debut in the Pac-12 Conference for Cal. The Cal Golden Bears were highest ranked no.15 that year.

Dung quickly found her place as an ace pitcher during her first season with the bears. She made 33 appearances with 27 starts and ranked through the top 10 in all major pitching categories in the PAC 12: ERA (1.96), wins (19), batters struck out (186), innings pitched (160.2), opposing batting average (.181). She struck out a career-best 15 batters against Fordham. Dung also threw the first perfect game for the Golden Bears in almost a decade, being the first perfect game since 2010, and the first perfect game of her career, during her first collegiate appearance in Hawaii while striking out 12 against UTEP in March. She was nominated Most Valuable Pitcher on the Malihini Kipa Aloha All-Tournament Team after playing the University of Hawaii.

Senior 
Despite pitching with injury for the first half of her senior year, for her final season, Dung was selected to the NFCA All-Region Third Team for the second time in her career. She also earned All-Conference honors being selected to the All-Pac-12 Conference Second Team. Softball America Top Softball Performances of the Week. Ranked 10 in Top 25 Names in College Softball. Dung was predicted to be drafted to the Aussie Peppers of Mankato, Minnesota by FloSoftball.

She led the Golden Bears to their first top 25 wins since 2017 against No.21 James Madison University and also silenced one of the nations best offenses at the time by pitching a one-hitter through the first 5 innings in the Bear's upset against the No. 22 Arizona State Sun Devils. Dung gave Cal its first top 5 win of the last few years as she pitched a gem shutting out the No.5/No.1 Arizona Wildcats for the first time since 2012, ending the Wildcats 21-game winning streak with one of the most potent home run hitting lineups in the nation. In March Dung pitched a complete game against No.1 and eventual WCWS Champions UCLA allowing no earned runs and four hits. Dung collected the Bear's win against OSU allowing one run and four strikeouts in 5 innings. On February 22 Dung struck out 12 batters and allowed only two hits in a vital 1–0 victory over Duke University. - earning her national recognition as one of the top 9 performances in softball for that week.

Professional and international career 
In 2020, Dung signed to play professionally in the National Pro Fastpitch with Los Angeles based California Commotion and the Chicago based Athletes Unlimited Softball league. Dung played semi-professionally for the city of Juncos in 2018 for the Puerto Rican Higher League.

Puerto Rican National Team

2018 
Because Dung is partially Puerto Rican, she was invited to try out for the 2018 Puerto Rico Women's National Softball Team. Dung was recorded on the roster for the 2018 U.S. International Cup, 2018 Central American and Caribbean Games, and the 2018 Women's Softball World Championship Tournament. Dung struck out eight in a 1-hit shutout during Puerto Rico's victory over South Africa in the World Championships in August. At the 2018 Central American and Caribbean Games in Barranquilla, Colombia, the Puerto Rican Women's National Softball Team took home the gold medal for the first time in over 20 years.

2019 
Dung was selected to the roster for the 2019 World Cup of Softball, 2019 Canada Cup, 2019 Pan American Games, and 2019 Tokyo 2020 Americas Olympic Qualifier. In the 2019 World Cup Dung collected 3 of the team's 4 wins against Philippines, Chinese Taipei, and No.5 Mexico. Dung and Puerto Rico won the bronze medal at the 2019 Pan American Games in Lima, Peru. Competed in the Tokyo 2020 Olympic Qualifier in Surrey, Canada where she led the tournament in wins, collecting 3 of the team's 5 wins. Led her team with 18 strikeouts in 8.2 innings which also ranked in the top 5 of the tournament, and also held a 0.81 ERA.

Dung currently plays professionally in the United States for the Athletes Unlimited Professional Sports League.

References 

1997 births
Living people
People from Oahu
Softball players from Hawaii
Fresno State Bulldogs softball players
University of California, Berkeley alumni
Pan American Games medalists in softball
Pan American Games bronze medalists for Puerto Rico
Softball players at the 2019 Pan American Games
Central American and Caribbean Games gold medalists for Puerto Rico
Central American and Caribbean Games medalists in softball
Competitors at the 2018 Central American and Caribbean Games
Medalists at the 2019 Pan American Games